Hansel Ltd. is a publicly owned non-profit company which operates as the central procurement unit of the Finnish Government. The objective of the operations of the company is to produce savings for the Finnish Government by putting framework agreements for goods and services out to tender. Hansel's tasks and roles are defined in the Public Procurement Act and the State Procurement Strategy.

In 2015, Hansel Ltd. made government procurement agreements to a value of EUR 697  million (EUR 715  million in 2014). Hansel Ltd's customers consist of the ministries, their subordinate bureaus and other government agencies in Finland.

The public procurement that Hansel Ltd is involved in refers to the purchase of goods, services and construction work required from external suppliers by the state, municipalities, joint municipal authorities, state-owned enterprises and other procurement units defined under public procurement legislation.

The company is an expert organisation that employs 74 professionals from various fields and that emphasises responsibility in its operations. Hansel Ltd. operates under the auspices of the Finnish Ministry of Finance.

Similar organisations can be found in most western European countries, for instance the Crown Commercial Service in the United Kingdom, SKI - National Procurement Ltd. in Denmark and Consip in Italy.

References

External links
Hansel.fi Official website 
Hansel's Annual Report and Sustainability Report 2015 
Hansel's Annual Report and Sustainability Report 2014 
Hansel's Annual Report and Sustainability Report 2013 
Ministry of Finance: Procurement procedures in central government
Ministry of Finance: Reforming the legislation of Hansel Ltd

Government-owned companies of Finland
Companies established in 2003
Companies based in Helsinki
2003 establishments in Finland